In topology, a preclosure operator or Čech closure operator is a map between subsets of a set, similar to a topological closure operator, except that it is not required to be idempotent. That is, a preclosure operator obeys only three of the four Kuratowski closure axioms.

Definition 
A preclosure operator on a set  is a map  

where  is the power set of 

The preclosure operator has to satisfy the following properties:
  (Preservation of nullary unions);
  (Extensivity);
  (Preservation of binary unions).

The last axiom implies  the following:

 4.  implies .

Topology
A set  is closed (with respect to the preclosure) if .  A set  is open (with respect to the preclosure) if its complement  is closed. The collection of all open sets generated by the preclosure operator is a topology; however, the above topology does not capture the notion of convergence associated to the operator, one should consider a pretopology, instead.

Examples

Premetrics

is a preclosure on

Sequential spaces
The sequential closure operator  is a preclosure operator.

See also
 Eduard Čech

References

 A.V. Arkhangelskii, L.S.Pontryagin, General Topology I, (1990) Springer-Verlag, Berlin. .
 B. Banascheski, Bourbaki's Fixpoint Lemma reconsidered, Comment. Math. Univ. Carolinae 33 (1992), 303-309.

Closure operators